A partial solar eclipse occurred on October 11, 1931. A solar eclipse occurs when the Moon passes between Earth and the Sun, thereby totally or partly obscuring the image of the Sun for a viewer on Earth. A partial solar eclipse occurs in the polar regions of the Earth when the center of the Moon's shadow misses the Earth.
This event was visible as a partial solar eclipse from southern South America, and parts of Antarctica.

Related eclipses

Solar eclipses 1928–1931

Notes

References

External links 

1931 10 11
1931 in science
1931 10 11
October 1931 events